Aa macra is a species of orchid in the genus Aa. It is found in Ecuador.

References

macra
Plants described in 1921
Flora of Ecuador